The National Bank of Slovakia (NBS) building is a skyscraper in Bratislava, Slovakia.  Opened on 23 May 2002, it is the headquarters of the National Bank of Slovakia (NBS) .

The NBS building is located in Bratislava I District – the Old Town,  At 111 m tall, it is one of the tallest buildings in Bratislava.

Background

Building project proposals 
The public tender for the NBS building received 24 competitive proposals. A jury of 21  specialists in architecture, construction,  and banking assisted NBS in choosing the winner. The project went to Martin Kusý and Pavol Paňák. Construction started in November 1996.

Architecture 
The lower horizontal part of the building houses the operational facilities of the Bank. The building also includes a congress hall and exhibition premises. This part of the building is built around a central yard with a raised green area. 

The building tower contains administrative offices. 

The design was realised exclusively by Slovak companies. The construction was carried out by the Association H – V – Z (Hydrostav, a.s., Bratislava, Váhostav, a.s., Žilina, ZIPP, s.r.o., Bratislava). Engineering activity was provided by the Association of Engineering (Keramoprojekt, a.s., Trenčín, Keraming, v.o.s., Trenčín, Chempik, a.s., Bratislava).

Statistics
 Height: 111 m
 Floors: 33
 Underground floors: 3
 Area: around 6.000 m²
 Number of lifts: 23
 Capacity: 1 005 people
 Number of underground parking places: 305

References

External links
 About the building on the NBS site (Slovak only)

Buildings and structures in Bratislava
Towers in Slovakia
21st-century architecture in Slovakia
Buildings and structures completed in 2002
2002 establishments in Slovakia